Operation Quds-1 is the name of a military operation which was started on June 14, 1985 during the Iran–Iraq War. The operation was launched by the forces of the Islamic Revolutionary Guard Corps of the Islamic Republic of Iran under the code name of "Ya Mohammad Rasoolullah" (Persian: یامحمد رسول‌الله) in the "Hur al-Hawizeh (Hawizeh Marshes)" operational zone which is located at the east of the Tigris River in Iraq. The goal of Quds-1 operation was to annihilate the Ba'athist forces in Iraq and in order to disrupt the cohesion of Saddam's army in the region; The size of the area was approximately one hundred and eighty square kilometers.

At the mentioned operation, which lasted for about 4 days, the forces of the Islamic Revolutionary Guard Corps captured two checkpoints, namely "Abu-Dharr" and "Abu-Laila"; and as a result, the Iraqi Ba'athist resistance was finished. At the initial step/day of the operation, Saddam's army did chemical/explosive attacks against Iranians by utilizing PC7s and helicopters.

See also
 Operation Quds-2
 Operation Badr

References

History of Khuzestan Province
Battles involving Iran
Battles involving Iraq
Military operations of the Iran–Iraq War
Military operations involving chemical weapons
Military operations involving chemical weapons during the Iran–Iraq War